Sprot or Sprott or Sprotte may refer to:

Sprot (surname)
Sprott, Alabama, an unincorporated community in Perry County, Alabama
Sprotte, a river in Germany

See also
Sprott School of Business
Sprott-Shaw College
Spratt (disambiguation)
Sport (disambiguation)